The Nashville Predators Radio Network is the regional sports radio network providing radio programming related to the National Hockey League's Nashville Predators. Headquartered in Nashville, Tennessee, the network is a joint venture with the NHL franchise and Cromwell Group, Inc.

The network began operations when the Predators first became an NHL expansion team at the beginning of the 1998-99 NHL season.

Affiliates

Former affiliates

References

External links
Nashville Predators Official Website
WPRT-FM Official Website

 

National Hockey League on the radio
Mass media in Nashville, Tennessee
Sports radio networks in the United States
1998 establishments in the United States